Vollenhoven is a Dutch surname. Notable people with the surname include:

Cornelis Vollenhoven (1778–1849), Dutch politician
D. H. Th. Vollenhoven (1892–1978), Dutch philosopher
Hanna Vollenhoven ((c 1894 – 1972) Dutch composer

See also
Van Vollenhoven

Dutch-language surnames
Surnames of Dutch origin